The Śatakatraya, (also known as) refers to three Indian collections of Sanskrit poetry, containing a hundred verses each.

The three Śatakas
Indian scholar K. M. Joglekar in his translation work 'Bhartrihari: Niti and Vairagya Shatakas' says that, "The Shatakas were composed when Bhartrihari had renounced the world. It is not easy to say in what order they were written, from the subject matter of each of them, it is likely that Shringarashatak was written first, then followed the Niti and lastly the Vairagyashataka".

The Nītiśataka deals with nīti, roughly meaning ethics and morality. Śṛṅgāraśataka deals with love and women. Vairāgyaśataka contains verses on renunciation. The Sanskrit scholar Barbara Stoler Miller translated these sections as Among Fools and Kings, Passionate Encounters and Refuge in the Forest respectively.

Especially in the Vairāgyaśataka, but also in the other two, his poetry displays the depth and intensity of his renunciation as he vacillates between the pursuits of fleshly desires and those of the spirit. Thus it reveals the conflict experienced "between a profound attraction to sensual beauty and the yearning for liberation from it", showing how "most great Indian art could be at once so sensuous and so spiritual".

There is great variation between versions of his Śatakas, and together the available manuscripts have over 700 verses instead of 300. D. D. Kosambi identified about 200 verses that appear in all manuscripts. Despite the variation in content, there is remarkable similarity in theme; Kosambi believes that each śataka came to attract a certain type of stanza similar to the ones present in the original collection. Moreover, at least among the 200 "common" stanzas, there is a distinctive voice of irony, scepticism and discontent, making the attribution to a single author plausible.

According to one legend associated with him (possibly in confusion with the legend of king Bharthari), he was a king, who once gave a magic fruit to his wife, who gave it to another man, who in turn gave it to another woman, and finally it reached the king again. Reflecting on these events, he realised the futility of love and worldly pleasures, renounced his kingdom, retired to the forest, and wrote poetry. This is connected with a famous verse that appears in the collections:

However, the verse is probably a later addition, and many of the other verses suggest that the poet was not a king but a courtier serving a king — thus there are many verses rebuking the foolish pride of kings, and bemoaning the indignity of servitude.

Nītiśataka 
The Sanskrit scholar and commentator Budhendra has classified the Nītiśhataka into the following sections, each called a paddhati:
 mūrkha-paddhati – On Fools and Folly
 vidvat-paddhati – On Wisdom
 māna-śaurya-paddhati – On Pride and Heroism
 artha-paddhati – On Wealth
 durjana-paddhati – On Wicked People
 sujana-paddhati – On Wise Men
 paropakāra-paddhati – On Virtue
 dhairya-paddhati - On Firmness, Valor
 daiva-paddhati – On Fate
 karma-paddhati – On Work

 Some verses from Nītiśataka

संगीतसाहित्यकलाविहीनः 
साक्षात् पशुःपुच्छविषाणहीनः |
तृणं नखादन्नपिजीवमानः 
तद्भागधेयंपरमंपशूनाम् ||	

saṅgīta-sāhitya-kalā-vihīnaḥ 
sākṣāt paśuḥ puccha-viṣāṇa-hīnaḥ | 
tṛṇaṃ na khādann api jīvamānaḥ
tad bhāgadhēyaṃ paramaṃ paśūnām ||

This verse means that a  human devoid of poetry, music and arts is equivalent to an animal which does not have horns and tails. It is the great good luck of other beasts that they don't graze grass, and still survive.

Editions of the Śatakatraya

Without translation
 . Includes detailed notes in English.
 . With Sanskrit commentary by the author.
 . With Sanskrit commentary by the author.
 D. D. Kosambi, 1945 The Satakatrayam of Bhartrhari with the Comm. of Ramarsi, edited in collaboration with Pt. K. V. Krishnamoorthi Sharma (Anandasrama Sanskrit Series, No.127, Poona)
 D. D. Kosambi, 1946 The Southern Archetype of Epigrams Ascribed to Bhartrhari (Bharatiya Vidya Series 9, Bombay) (First critical edition of a Bhartrhari recension.)
 D. D. Kosambi, 1948 The Epigrams Attributed to Bhartrhari (Singhi Jain Series 23, Bombay) (Comprehensive edition of the poet's work remarkable for rigorous standards of text criticism.) Review by Emeneau.  Digitized by the Digital Library of India
 D. D. Kosambi, 1959 Bhartrihari's Satakatrayam With the Oldest Commentary of Jain Scholar Dhanasāragaṇi With Principal Variants from Many Manuscripts etc. (Bombay, Bharatiya Vidya Bhavan). Digitized by the Digital Library of India

Sanskrit with translation
 . Sanskrit text with introduction, translation and notes in Latin. All three śatakas, also includes Bilhana's Chaura-panchashika.
 . Hindi and English translation.
  Translation and notes.
 
 . Brief commentary in Sanskrit, translation and notes in English.
 . Sanskrit text with facing free-verse translation.
 Greg Bailey and Richard F. Gombrich, 2005, Love Lyrics by Amaru [and] Bhartṛhari, translated by Greg Bailey & by Bilhaṇa edited and translated by Richard Gombrich (New York: NYU). See: Open Library . Sanskrit text with facing free-verse translation.

Translation
(without Sanskrit text)
  . German verse translation of all three śatakas, based on Bohlen's edition.
 . French prose translation of all three śatakas.
  ,. Rhyming translation of the Nīti and Vairāgya Śatakas.
 J M Kennedy, The Satakas; or, Wise sayings of Bhartrihari. London, 1913. Prose translation of all three śatakas.
  . London: Trübner, 1886, reprint Routledge 2000, . Prose translation of the Nīti and Vairāgya Śatakas.
  . Rhyming translation of 100 verses, mostly from Bhartṛhari.
 . Rhyming translation of 85 verses from Bhartṛhari, plus 15 from other sources.
 
 . Republished 1998 by the Sri Aurobindo Society, . Available online in Volume 5 (Translations) of his complete works. Verse translation of the Nīti Śataka.

References

External links
 About Bhartṛhari
 On Bhartṛhari by Greg Bailey, Clay Sanskrit Library translator
 Bhartṛhari on Poetry Portal
‘Detachment’ in Vairāgyaśataka of Bhartṛhari: Where Buddhist and Brahmanic Ideas Concord Rev. Upali

 The poems
 Transliterated Sanskrit text of all shatakas at GRETIL
 Ṣrṇgārashatakam by Bhartṛhari at Sanskrit Documents Collection
 Vairāgyashatakam by Bhartṛhari at Sanskrit Documents Collection
 Nītishatakam by Bhartṛhari at Sanskrit Documents Collection
 Some of Bhartṛhari's poems in English
 

Sanskrit poetry
5th-century works